Big Brother was the Russian version of the reality show Big Brother in Russia. It was produced by Endemol. Unlike most of the other countries it is aired in, Big Brother had only one season in Russia and there are no plans for a second season.

Later on, changes were made and it resurfaced as Dom-2 ("House Two"), with little resemblance to the original.

The show started on 10 May 2005 and finished on 5 August 2005. It lasted for 88 Days. The program was broadcast every night at 20:00 on TNT. 17 housemates entered the House, with 3 housemates walking, and none being ejected. The winner was Anastasiya Yagaylova. Her prize was 10,000,000 RUB.

Housemates

Nominations table

References

See also
Behind the Glass (TV series)

TNT (Russian TV channel) original programming
2005 Russian television seasons
Russia
Russian reality television series
2005 Russian television series debuts
2005 Russian television series endings
2000s Russian television series